The Ambassador Extraordinary and Plenipotentiary of the Russian Federation to Japan is the official representative of the President and the Government of the Russian Federation to the Prime Minister and the Government of Japan.

The ambassador and his staff work at large in the Embassy of Russia in Tokyo. There are consulates general in Osaka, Niigata, and Sapporo, and a consulate in Hakodate. The post of Russian Ambassador to Japan is currently vacant, following the recall of ambassador  on 25 November 2022.

History of diplomatic relations

The first official representative of Russia to Japan was Yevfimiy Putyatin in the early 1850s. Putyatin arranged the signing of the Treaty of Shimoda in 1855 which established diplomatic contacts between the two nations, and the Treaty of Tientsin in 1858. Consulates were set up in several Japanese cities, and with the Meiji Restoration in 1868, restrictions on contact with foreign nations were further relaxed. The first consulate was opened in Hakodate in 1858 by Iosif Goshkevich. A consulate in the Imperial capital of Edo, later Tokyo, was first established in 1872 by consul , and further developed into the embassy under his successor Karl von Struve. Relations were interrupted with the outbreak of the Russo-Japanese War in 1904, but were re-established after the signing of the Treaty of Portsmouth.

After the February Revolution in 1917, contacts were maintained between Japan and the Russian Provisional Government, and the diplomatic mission continued to function, albeit without accreditation, after the October Revolution later that year. The Japanese government established diplomatic relations with the Soviet Union in 1925. The Soviet Union fought the brief Soviet–Japanese War towards the end of the Second World War, and afterwards refused to sign the Treaty of San Francisco, which normalised relations between Japan and the former allied powers. Full diplomatic relations were not resumed until after the Soviet–Japanese Joint Declaration of 1956. Diplomatic relations continued throughout the twentieth century, and since the dissolution of the Soviet Union in 1991, ambassadors have been exchanged between Japan and the Russian Federation.

List of representatives (1871 – present)

Representatives of the Russian Empire to Japan (1871–1917)

Representatives of the Russian Provisional Government to Japan (March 1917 – unaccredited after October 1917)

Representatives of the Soviet Union to Japan (1925–1991)

Representatives of the Russian Federation to Japan (1991 – present)

References

 
Japan
Russia